Dr. Buzzard's Original Savannah Band Meets King Penett is the second studio album by Dr. Buzzard's Original Savannah Band. It was released in 1978 by RCA. It peaked at number 36 on the Billboard 200 chart and number 23 on the Top R&B Albums chart.

Track listing

Personnel
 Cory Daye – vocals
 Stony Browder – guitar, keyboards, vocals
 Paulinho da Costa – percussion
 August Darnell – bass, vocals
 Andy "Coati Mundi" Hernandez – percussion
 Susandra Minsky – vocals
 Mickey Sevilla – drums

Charts

References

External links
 

1978 albums
Dr. Buzzard's Original Savannah Band albums
RCA Records albums